Atlético Orinoco is a Venezuelan football club from Ciudad Guayana. It was founded in 2005 and currently plays in the Venezuelan Segunda División.

References 
http://www.ceroacero.es/equipa.php?id=16468&epoca_id=138

Football teams in Venezuela